Younous Omarjee (born 30 September 1969 in Saint-Denis, Réunion) is a French politician who has been serving as a Member of the European Parliament since 4 January 2012. He sits with the Confederal Group of the European United Left - Nordic Green Left.

Since July 2019, Omarjee has been chairing the European Parliament Committee on Regional Development. He is also a member of the Conference of Committee Chairs, of the European Parliament Committee on Budgets and of the European Parliament Committee on Budgetary Control.

In addition to his committee assignments, Omarjee is one of the vice-presidents of the European Parliament Anti-Racism and Diversity Intergroup and a member of the European Parliament Intergroup on LGBT Rights, the European Parliament Intergroup on the Welfare and Conservation of Animals, and the URBAN Intergroup.

References

Living people
1969 births
French communists
Réunionnais communists
Communist Party of Réunion MEPs
MEPs for France 2009–2014
MEPs for the Overseas Territories of France 2014–2019
MEPs for France 2019–2024
People from Saint-Denis, Réunion
Alliance of the Overseas MEPs